The Gefängnis Zürich (Zürich Prison) is a prison in the city of Zürich, Switzerland, located at the Rotwandstrasse.

History
The Gefängnis Zürich opened in 1916, and has been extended several times, most recently in 1991 with the establishment of a provisional facility with 34 beds in one of two courtyards. It is the largest district jail of the Canton of Zürich, and has a capacity of 170 prisoners (including an 18-bed ward for female prisoners) and 48 employees (as of 2009). Its director is Markus Epple. It is located in the immediate vicinity of 5 general and 2 specialized district attorney offices. Most of the prisoners are remandees, with only a few convicts serving sentences there.

Notable Prisoners
Vitaly Kaloyev was incarcerated in 2005 on charges of killing an air traffic controller, Peter Nielsen, whom he blamed for the death of his wife and two children in a mid-air collision over Überlingen in 2002. Kaloyev was finally released and returned to his homeland of North Ossetia–Alania in 2007 after serving two years in a sentence.

The prison was the site of incarceration for Mohamed Achraf, a suspect in Spanish investigations into a failed bomb attack on Spain's National Court. Achraf was imprisoned in 2004 and spent some of his time within the prison in solitary confinement due to his status as a suspected terrorist.

Roman Polanski has been incarcerated in 2009, according to several news media, pending his extradition hearing.

Controversy and Deaths in Custody
In 2008, a 17-year-old Swiss prisoner in remand on suspicion of driving offences, property offences and violent crimes strangled himself in his prison cell with scraps of cloth.

References

External links

Gefängnis Zürich 

Prisons in Switzerland
Buildings and structures in Zürich